Terminous is a census-designated place in San Joaquin County, California. It is located on the Terminous Tract, an island of the Sacramento–San Joaquin River Delta. The 2010 United States census reported Terminous's population as 381.

Terminous was named from its location at the "terminus" of a road.

Geography
According to the United States Census Bureau, the CDP covers an area of 1.0 square miles (2.5 km), all of it land.

Demographics
At the 2010 census Terminous had a population of 381. The racial makeup of Terminous was 338 (88.7%) Caucasian, 2 (0.5%) African American, 6 (1.6%) Native American, 7 (1.8%) Asian, 0 (0.0%) Pacific Islander, 13 (3.4%) from other races, and 15 (3.9%) from two or more races. Hispanic or Latino of any race were 40 people (10.5%).

The whole population lived in households, no one lived in non-institutionalized group quarters and no one was institutionalized.

There were 182 households, 25 (13.7%) had children under the age of 18 living in them, 92 (50.5%) were opposite-sex married couples living together, 15 (8.2%) had a female householder with no husband present, 7 (3.8%) had a male householder with no wife present.  There were 15 (8.2%) unmarried opposite-sex partnerships, and 4 (2.2%) same-sex married couples or partnerships. 50 households (27.5%) were one person and 23 (12.6%) had someone living alone who was 65 or older. The average household size was 2.09.  There were 114 families (62.6% of households); the average family size was 2.50.

The age distribution was 34 people (8.9%) under the age of 18, 23 people (6.0%) aged 18 to 24, 41 people (10.8%) aged 25 to 44, 131 people (34.4%) aged 45 to 64, and 152 people (39.9%) who were 65 or older.  The median age was 60.3 years. For every 100 females, there were 100.5 males.  For every 100 females age 18 and over, there were 101.7 males.

There were 206 housing units at an average density of 210.8 per square mile, of the occupied units 155 (85.2%) were owner-occupied and 27 (14.8%) were rented. The homeowner vacancy rate was 3.7%; the rental vacancy rate was 22.9%.  306 people (80.3% of the population) lived in owner-occupied housing units and 75 people (19.7%) lived in rental housing units.

References

Census-designated places in San Joaquin County, California
Census-designated places in California